Fábio Ferreira may refer to:

 Fábio Ferreira (footballer, born 1984), Brazilian footballer 
 Fábio Ferreira (footballer, born 1989), Portuguese footballer